Lithuania, officially the Republic of Lithuania, is a country in the Baltic region of Europe. It is one of three Baltic states and lies on the eastern shore of the Baltic Sea. Lithuania shares land borders with Latvia to the north, Belarus to the east and south, Poland to the south, and Russia to the southwest. It has a maritime border with Sweden to the west on the Baltic Sea. Its capital and largest city is Vilnius; other major cities are Kaunas and Klaipėda. Lithuanians belong to the ethno-linguistic group of the Balts and speak Lithuanian, one of only a few living Baltic languages.

For millennia the southeastern shores of the Baltic Sea were inhabited by various Baltic tribes. In the 1230s, Lithuanian lands were united by Mindaugas, becoming king and founding the Kingdom of Lithuania on 6 July 1253. In the 14th century, the Grand Duchy of Lithuania was the largest country in Europe; present-day Lithuania, Belarus, most of Ukraine, and parts of Poland and Russia were all lands of the Grand Duchy. The Crown of the Kingdom of Poland and the Grand Duchy of Lithuania were in a de facto personal union from 1386 with the marriage of the Polish queen Hedwig and Lithuania's Grand Duke Jogaila, who was crowned King jure uxoris Władysław II Jagiełło of Poland. The Commonwealth of Poland and Lithuania was established by the Union of Lublin in July 1569. The Commonwealth lasted more than two centuries, until neighbouring countries dismantled it in 1772–1795, with the Russian Empire annexing most of Lithuania's territory. As World War I ended, Lithuania's Act of Independence was signed on 16 February 1918, founding the modern Republic of Lithuania. In World War II, Lithuania was occupied first by the Soviet Union and then by Nazi Germany. Towards the end of the war in 1944, when the Germans were retreating, the Soviet Union reoccupied Lithuania. Lithuanian armed resistance to the Soviet occupation lasted until the early 1950s. On 11 March 1990, a year before the formal dissolution of the Soviet Union, Lithuania passed the Act of the Re-Establishment of the State of Lithuania, becoming the first Soviet republic to break away when it proclaimed the restoration of its independence.

Lithuania is a developed country, with a high income advanced economy; ranking very high in the Human Development Index. It ranks favourably in terms of civil liberties, press freedom, internet freedom, democratic governance, and peacefulness. Lithuania is a member of the European Union, the Council of Europe, eurozone, the Nordic Investment Bank, Schengen Agreement, NATO and OECD. It also participates in the Nordic-Baltic Eight (NB8) regional co-operation format.

Etymology

The first known record of the name of Lithuania is in a 9 March 1009 story of Saint Bruno in the Quedlinburg Chronicle. The Chronicle recorded a Latinized form of the name Lietuva: Litua (pronounced ). Due to the lack of reliable evidence, the true meaning of the name is unknown. Nowadays, scholars still debate the meaning of the word and there are a few plausible versions.

Since Lietuva has a suffix (-uva), the original word should have no suffix. A likely candidate is Lietā. Because many Baltic ethnonyms originated from hydronyms, linguists have searched for its origin among local hydronyms. Usually, such names evolved through the following process: hydronym → toponym → ethnonym. Lietava, a small river not far from Kernavė, the core area of the early Lithuanian state and a possible first capital of the eventual Grand Duchy of Lithuania, is usually credited as the source of the name. However, the river is very small and some find it improbable that such a small and local object could have lent its name to an entire nation. On the other hand, such naming is not unprecedented in world history.

Artūras Dubonis proposed another hypothesis, that Lietuva relates to the word leičiai (plural of leitis). From the middle of the 13th century, leičiai were a distinct warrior social group of the Lithuanian society subordinate to the Lithuanian ruler or the state itself. The word leičiai is used in the 14–16th century historical sources as an ethnonym for Lithuanians (but not Samogitians) and is still used, usually poetically or in historical contexts, in the Latvian language, which is closely related to Lithuanian.

History

The first people settled in the territory of Lithuania after the last glacial period in the 10th millennium BC: Kunda, Neman and Narva cultures. They were traveling hunters and did not form stable settlements. In the 8th millennium BC, the climate became much warmer, and forests developed. The inhabitants of what is now Lithuania then travelled less and engaged in local hunting, gathering and fresh-water fishing. Agriculture did not emerge until the 3rd millennium BC due to a harsh climate and terrain and a lack of suitable tools to cultivate the land. Crafts and trade also started to form at this time. Over a millennium, the Indo-Europeans, who arrived in the 3rd – 2nd millennium BC, mixed with the local population and formed various Baltic tribes.

The Baltic tribes did not maintain close cultural or political contacts with the Roman Empire, but they did maintain trade contacts (see Amber Road). Tacitus, in his study Germania, described the Aesti people, inhabitants of the south-eastern Baltic Sea shores who were probably Balts, around the year 97 AD. The Western Balts differentiated and became known to outside chroniclers first. Ptolemy in the 2nd century AD knew of the Galindians and Yotvingians, and early medieval chroniclers mentioned Old Prussians, Curonians and Semigallians.

The Lithuanian language is considered to be very conservative for its close connection to Indo-European roots. It is believed to have differentiated from the Latvian language, the most closely related existing language, around the 7th century. Traditional Lithuanian pagan customs and mythology, with many archaic elements, were long preserved. Rulers' bodies were cremated up until the conversion to Christianity: the descriptions of the cremation ceremonies of the grand dukes Algirdas and Kęstutis have survived.

Grand Duchy of Lithuania

From the 9th to the 11th centuries, coastal Balts were subjected to raids by the Vikings, and the kings of Denmark collected tribute at times. During the 10–11th centuries, Lithuanian territories were among the lands paying tribute to Kievan Rus', and Yaroslav the Wise was among the Ruthenian rulers who invaded Lithuania (from 1040). From the mid-12th century, it was the Lithuanians who were invading Ruthenian territories. In 1183, Polotsk and Pskov were ravaged, and even the distant and powerful Novgorod Republic was repeatedly threatened by the excursions from the emerging Lithuanian war machine toward the end of the 12th century.

From the late 12th century, an organized Lithuanian military force existed; it was used for external raids, plundering and the gathering of slaves. Such military and pecuniary activities fostered social differentiation and triggered a struggle for power in Lithuania. This initiated the formation of early statehood, from which the Grand Duchy of Lithuania developed. The disparate Lithuanian tribes along the Nemunas were united into the Lithuanian state by 1219, at the latest. The only Lithuanian Roman Catholic king, Mindaugas, was baptised as a Roman Catholic in 1251 and crowned as King of Lithuania on 6 July 1253.

After his assassination in 1263, pagan Lithuania was a target of the Christian crusades of the Teutonic Knights and the Livonian Order. The siege of Pilėnai is noted for the Lithuanians' defense against the intruders. Despite the devastating century-long struggle with the Orders, the Grand Duchy of Lithuania expanded rapidly, overtaking former Ruthenian principalities of Kievan Rus'.

On 22 September 1236, the Battle of Saulė between Samogitians and the Livonian Brothers of the Sword took place close to Šiauliai. The Livonian Brothers were defeated during it and their further conquest of the Balts lands were stopped. The battle inspired rebellions among the Curonians, Semigallians, Selonians, Oeselians, tribes previously conquered by the Sword-Brothers. Some thirty years' worth of conquests on the left bank of Daugava were lost. In 2000, the Lithuanian and Latvian parliaments declared 22 September to be the Day of Baltic Unity.

According to the legend, Grand Duke Gediminas was once hunting near the Vilnia River; tired after the successful hunt, he settled in for the night and dreamed of a huge Iron Wolf standing on top a hill and howling as strong and loud as a hundred wolves. Krivis (pagan priest) Lizdeika interpreted the dream that the Iron Wolf represents Vilnius Castles. Gediminas, obeying the will of the gods, built the city and gave it the name Vilnius – from the stream of the Vilnia River.

In 1362 or 1363, Grand Duke Algirdas achieved a decisive victory in the Battle of Blue Waters against the Golden Horde and stopped its further expansion in the present-day Ukraine. The victory brought the city of Kyiv and a large part of present-day Ukraine, including sparsely populated Podolia and Dykra, under the control of the expanding Grand Duchy of Lithuania. After taking Kyiv, Lithuania became a direct neighbor and rival of the Grand Duchy of Moscow.

By the end of the 14th century, Lithuania was one of the largest countries in Europe and included present-day Belarus, Ukraine, and parts of Poland and Russia. The geopolitical situation between the west and the east determined the multicultural and multi-confessional character of the Grand Duchy of Lithuania. The ruling elite practised religious tolerance and the Chancery Slavonic language was used as an auxiliary language to Latin for official documents.

In 1385, the Grand Duke Jogaila accepted Poland's offer to become its king. Jogaila embarked on gradual Christianization of Lithuania and established a personal union between Poland and Lithuania. Lithuania was one of the last pagan areas of Europe to adopt Christianity. While territories to the north had been Christianized in 1186 by Western merchants and missionaries who formed the Order of the Brothers and the Sword to spread Christianity through military organization, the Lithuanians had defeated the Order's militant efforts in 1236.

After two civil wars, Vytautas the Great became the Grand Duke of Lithuania in 1392. During his reign, Lithuania reached the peak of its territorial expansion, centralization of the state began, and the Lithuanian nobility became increasingly prominent in state politics. In the great Battle of the Vorskla River in 1399, the combined forces of Tokhtamysh and Vytautas were defeated by the Mongols. Thanks to close cooperation, the armies of Lithuania and Poland achieved a victory over the Teutonic Knights in 1410 at the Battle of Grunwald, one of the largest battles of medieval Europe.

In January 1429, at the Congress of Lutsk Vytautas received the title of King of Lithuania with the backing of Sigismund, Holy Roman Emperor, but the envoys who were transporting the crown were stopped by Polish magnates in autumn of 1430. Another crown was sent, but Vytautas died in the Trakai Island Castle several days before it reached Lithuania. He was buried in the Cathedral of Vilnius.

After the deaths of Jogaila and Vytautas, the Lithuanian nobility attempted to break the union between Poland and Lithuania, independently selecting Grand Dukes from the Jagiellon dynasty. But, at the end of the 15th century, Lithuania was forced to seek a closer alliance with Poland when the growing power of the Grand Duchy of Moscow threatened Lithuania's Russian principalities and sparked the Muscovite–Lithuanian Wars and the Livonian War.

On 8 September 1514, the Battle of Orsha between Lithuanians, commanded by the Grand Hetman Konstanty Ostrogski, and Muscovites was fought. According to Rerum Moscoviticarum Commentarii by Sigismund von Herberstein, the primary source for information on the battle, the much smaller army of Poland–Lithuania (under 30,000 men) defeated a force of 80,000 Muscovite soldiers, capturing their camp and commander. The battle destroyed a military alliance against Lithuania and Poland. Thousands of Muscovites were captured as prisoners and used as labourers in the Lithuanian manors, while Konstanty Ostrogski delivered the captured Muscovite flags to the Cathedral of Vilnius.

The Livonian War was ceased for ten years with a Truce of Yam-Zapolsky signed on 15 January 1582 according to which the already Polish–Lithuanian Commonwealth recovered Livonia, Polotsk and Velizh, but transferred Velikiye Luki to the Tsardom of Russia. The truce was extended for twenty years in 1600, when a diplomatic mission to Moscow led by Lew Sapieha concluded negotiations with Tsar Boris Godunov. The truce was broken when the Poles invaded Muscovy in 1605.

Polish–Lithuanian Commonwealth

The Polish–Lithuanian Commonwealth was created in 1569 by the Union of Lublin. As a member of the Commonwealth, Lithuania retained its institutions, including a separate army, currency, and statutory laws – the Statute of Lithuania. Eventually Polonization affected all aspects of Lithuanian life: politics, language, culture, and national identity. From the mid-16th to the mid-17th centuries, culture, arts, and education flourished, fueled by the Renaissance and the Protestant Reformation. From 1573, the Kings of Poland and Grand Dukes of Lithuania were elected by the nobility, who were granted ever-increasing Golden Liberties. These liberties, especially the liberum veto, led to anarchy and the eventual dissolution of the state.

The Commonwealth reached its Golden Age in the early 17th century. Its powerful parliament was dominated by nobles who were reluctant to get involved in the Thirty Years' War; this neutrality spared the country from the ravages of a political-religious conflict that devastated most of contemporary Europe. The Commonwealth held its own against Sweden, the Tsardom of Russia, and vassals of the Ottoman Empire, and even launched successful expansionist offensives against its neighbours. In several invasions during the Time of Troubles, Commonwealth troops entered Russia and managed to take Moscow and hold it from 27 September 1610 to 4 November 1612, when they were driven out after a siege.

In 1655, after the extinguishing battle, for the first time in history the Lithuanian capital Vilnius was taken by a foreign army. The Russian army looted the city, splendid churches, and manors. Between 8,000 and 10,000 citizens were killed; the city burned for 17 days. Those who returned after the catastrophe could not recognise the city. The Russian occupation of the Grand Duchy of Lithuania lasted up to 1661. Many artefacts and cultural heritage were either lost or looted, significant parts of the state archive – Lithuanian Metrica, collected since the 13th century, were lost and the rest was moved out of the country. During the Northern Wars (1655–1661), the Lithuanian territory and economy were devastated by the Swedish army. Almost all territory of the Grand Duchy of Lithuania was occupied by Swedish and Russian armies. This period is known as Tvanas (The Deluge).

Before it could fully recover, Lithuania was ravaged during the Great Northern War (1700–1721). The war, a plague, and a famine caused the deaths of approximately 40% of the country's population. Foreign powers, especially Russia, became dominant in the domestic politics of the Commonwealth. Numerous fractions among the nobility used the Golden Liberties to prevent any reforms.

The Constitution of 3 May 1791 was adopted by the Great Sejm (parliament) of the Polish–Lithuanian Commonwealth trying to save the state. The legislation was designed to redress the Commonwealth's political defects due to the system of Golden Liberties, also known as the "Nobles' Democracy," which had conferred disproportionate rights on the nobility (Szlachta) and over time had corrupted politics. The constitution sought to supplant the prevailing anarchy fostered by some of the country's magnates with a more democratic constitutional monarchy. It introduced elements of political equality between townspeople and nobility, and placed the peasants under the protection of the government, thus mitigating the worst abuses of serfdom. It banned parliamentary institutions such as the liberum veto, which had put the Sejm at the mercy of any deputy who could revoke all the legislation that had been passed by that Sejm. It was drafted in relation to a copy of the United States Constitution. It is regarded as the world's second-oldest codified national governmental constitution after the 1787 U.S. Constitution.

Russian Empire

Eventually, the Commonwealth was partitioned in 1772, 1793, and 1795 by the Russian Empire, Prussia, and the Habsburg monarchy.

The largest area of Lithuanian territory became part of the Russian Empire. After the unsuccessful uprisings in 1831 and 1863, the Tsarist authorities implemented a number of Russification policies. In 1840 the Third Statute of Lithuania was abolished. They banned the Lithuanian press, closed cultural and educational institutions and made Lithuania part of a new administrative region called Northwestern Krai. The Russification failed, owing to an extensive network of Lithuanian book smugglers and secret Lithuanian homeschooling.

After the Russo-Turkish War (1877–1878), when German diplomats assigned what were seen as Russian spoils of war to Turkey, the relationship between Russia and the German Empire became complicated. The Russian Empire resumed the construction of fortresses at its western borders for defence against a potential invasion from Germany in the West. On 7 July 1879 the Russian Emperor Alexander II approved a proposal from the Russian military leadership to build the largest "first-class" defensive structure in the entire state – the  Kaunas Fortress. Large numbers of Lithuanians went to the United States in 1867–1868 after a famine.

Simonas Daukantas promoted a return to Lithuania's pre-Commonwealth traditions, which he depicted as a Golden Age of Lithuania and a renewal of the native culture, based on the Lithuanian language and customs. With those ideas in mind, he wrote already in 1822 a history of Lithuania in Lithuanian – Darbai senųjų lietuvių ir žemaičių (The Deeds of Ancient Lithuanians and Samogitians), though it was not published at that time. A colleague of S. Daukantas, Teodor Narbutt wrote in Polish a voluminous Ancient History of the Lithuanian Nation (1835–1841), where he likewise expounded and expanded further on the concept of historic Lithuania, whose days of glory had ended with the Union of Lublin in 1569. Narbutt, invoking German scholarship, pointed out the relationship between the Lithuanian and Sanskrit languages. A Lithuanian National Revival, inspired by the ancient Lithuanian history, language and culture, laid the foundations of the modern Lithuanian nation and independent Lithuania.

20th and 21st centuries

1918–1939

As a result of the Great Retreat during World War I, Germany occupied the entire territory of Lithuania and Courland by the end of 1915. A new administrative entity, Ober Ost, was established. Lithuanians lost all political rights they had gained: personal freedom was restricted, and at the beginning, the Lithuanian press was banned. However, the Lithuanian intelligentsia tried to take advantage of the existing geopolitical situation and began to look for opportunities to restore Lithuania's independence. On 18–22 September 1917, the Vilnius Conference elected the 20-member Council of Lithuania. The council adopted the Act of Independence of Lithuania on 16 February 1918 which proclaimed the restoration of the independent state of Lithuania governed by democratic principles, with Vilnius as its capital. The state of Lithuania which had been built within the framework of the Act lasted from 1918 until 1940.

Following the capitulation of Germany in November 1918, the first Provisional Constitution of Lithuania was adopted and the first government of Prime Minister Augustinas Voldemaras was organized. At the same time, the army and other state institutions began to be organized. Lithuania fought three wars of independence: against the Bolsheviks who proclaimed the Lithuanian Soviet Socialist Republic, against the Bermontians, and against Poland. As a result of the staged Żeligowski's Mutiny in October 1920, Poland took control of Vilnius Region and annexed it as Wilno Voivodeship in 1922. Lithuania continued to claim Vilnius as its de jure capital (the de facto, provisional capital being Kaunas) and relations with Poland remained particularly tense and hostile for the entire interwar period. In January 1923, Lithuania staged the Klaipėda Revolt and captured Klaipėda Region (Memel territory) which was detached from East Prussia by the Treaty of Versailles. The region became an autonomous region of Lithuania.

On 15 May 1920, the first meeting of the democratically elected constituent assembly took place. The documents it adopted, i. e. the temporary (1920) and permanent (1922) constitutions of Lithuania, strove to regulate the life of the new state. Land, finance, and educational reforms started to be implemented. The currency of Lithuania, the Lithuanian litas, was introduced. The University of Lithuania was opened. All major public institutions had been established. As Lithuania began to gain stability, foreign countries started to recognize it. In 1921 Lithuania was admitted to the League of Nations.

On 17 December 1926, a military coup d'état took place, resulting in the replacement of the democratically elected government with a conservative authoritarian government led by Antanas Smetona. Augustinas Voldemaras was appointed to form a government. The so-called authoritarian phase had begun strengthening the influence of one party, the Lithuanian Nationalist Union, in the country. In 1927, the Seimas was dissolved. A new constitution was adopted in 1928, which consolidated presidential powers. Gradually, opposition parties were banned, censorship was tightened, and the rights of national minorities were narrowed. The only democratically elected body that continued to exist at the time was a Parliament of the Klaipėda Region.

On 15 July 1933, Steponas Darius and Stasys Girėnas, Lithuanian pilots, emigrants to the United States, made a significant flight in the history of world aviation. They flew across the Atlantic Ocean, covering a distance of  without landing, in 37 hours and 11 minutes. In terms of comparison, as far as the distance of non-stop flights was concerned, their result ranked second only to that of Russell Boardman and John Polando.

The provisional capital Kaunas, which was nicknamed Little Paris, and the country itself had a Western standard of living with sufficiently high salaries and low prices. At the time, qualified workers there were earning very similar real wages as workers in Germany, Italy, Switzerland and France, the country also had a surprisingly high natural increase in population of 9.7 and the industrial production of Lithuania increased by 160% from 1913 to 1940.

The situation was aggravated by the global economic crisis. The purchase price of agricultural products had declined significantly. In 1935, farmers began strikes in Suvalkija and Dzūkija. In addition to economic ones, political demands were made. The government cruelly suppressed the unrest. In the spring of 1936, four peasants were sentenced to death for starting the riots.

1939–1944

On 20 March 1939, after years of rising tensions, Lithuania was handed an ultimatum by Nazi Germany demanding it relinquish the Klaipėda Region. Two days later, the Lithuanian government accepted the ultimatum. When Nazi Germany and Soviet Union concluded the Molotov–Ribbentrop Pact, Lithuania was initially assigned to the German sphere of influence but was later transferred to the Soviet sphere. At the outbreak of World War II, Lithuania declared neutrality.

In October 1939, Lithuania was forced to sign the Soviet–Lithuanian Mutual Assistance Treaty: five Soviet military bases with 20,000 troops were established in Lithuania in exchange for Vilnius, which the Soviets had captured from Poland. Delayed by the Winter War with Finland, the Soviets issued an ultimatum to Lithuania on 14 June 1940. They demanded the replacement of the Lithuanian government and that the Red Army be allowed into the country. The government decided that, with Soviet bases already in Lithuania, armed resistance was impossible and accepted the ultimatum. President Smetona left the country, hoping to form a government in exile, while more than 200,000 Soviet Red Army soldiers crossed the Belarus–Lithuania border. The next day, identical ultimatums were presented to Latvia and Estonia. The Baltic states were occupied. The Soviets followed semi-constitutional procedures for transforming the independent countries into soviet republics and incorporating them into the Soviet Union.

Vladimir Dekanozov was sent to supervise the formation of the puppet People's Government and the rigged election to the People's Seimas. The Lithuanian Soviet Socialist Republic was proclaimed on 21 July and accepted into the Soviet Union on 3 August. Lithuania was rapidly Sovietized: political parties and various organizations (except the Communist Party of Lithuania) were outlawed, some 12,000 people, including many prominent figures, were arrested and imprisoned in Gulag as "enemies of the people", larger private property was nationalized, the Lithuanian litas was replaced by the Soviet rouble, farm taxes were increased by 50–200%, the Lithuanian Army was transformed into the 29th Rifle Corps of the Red Army. On 14–18 June 1941, less than a week before the Nazi invasion, some 17,000 Lithuanians were deported to Siberia, where many perished due to inhumane living conditions (see the June deportation). The occupation was not recognized by Western powers and the Lithuanian Diplomatic Service, based on pre-war consulates and legations, continued to represent independent Lithuania until 1990.

When Nazi Germany attacked the Soviet Union on 22 June 1941, Lithuanians began the anti-Soviet June Uprising, organized by the Lithuanian Activist Front. Lithuanians proclaimed independence and organized the Provisional Government of Lithuania. This government quickly self-disbanded. Lithuania became part of the Reichskommissariat Ostland, German civil administration.

By 1 December 1941, over 120,000 Lithuanian Jews, or 91–95% of Lithuania's pre-war Jewish community, had been killed. Nearly 100,000 Jews, Poles, Russians and Lithuanians were murdered at Paneriai. However, thousands of Lithuanian families risking their lives also protected Jews from the Holocaust. Israel has recognized 918 Lithuanians (as of 1 January 2021) as Righteous Among the Nations for risking their lives to save Jews during the Holocaust.

Approximately 13,000 men served in the Lithuanian Auxiliary Police Battalions. 10 of the 26 Lithuanian Auxiliary Police Battalions working with the Nazi Einsatzkommando, were involved in the mass killings. Rogue units organised by Algirdas Klimaitis and supervised by SS Brigadeführer Walter Stahlecker started the Kaunas pogrom in and around Kaunas on 25 June 1941. In 1941, the Lithuanian Security Police (Lietuvos saugumo policija), subordinate to Nazi Germany's Security Police and Nazi Germany's Criminal Police, was created. The Lietuvos saugumo policija targeted the communist underground.

A new occupation had begun. Nationalized assets were not returned to the residents. Some of them were forced to fight for Nazi Germany or were taken to German territories as forced labourers. Jewish people were herded into ghettos and gradually killed by shooting or sending them out to concentration camps.

1944–1990

After the retreat of the German armed forces, the Soviets reestablished their control of Lithuania in July–October 1944. The massive deportations to Siberia were resumed and lasted until the death of Stalin in 1953. Antanas Sniečkus, the leader of the Communist Party of Lithuania from 1940 to 1974, supervised the arrests and deportations. All Lithuanian national symbols were banned. Under the pretext of Lithuania's economic recovery, the Moscow authorities encouraged the migration of workers and other specialists to Lithuania with the intention to further integrate Lithuania into the Soviet Union and to develop the country's industry. At the same time, Lithuanians were lured to work in the USSR by promising them all the privileges of settling in a new place.

The second Soviet occupation was accompanied by the guerrilla warfare of the Lithuanian population, which took place in 1944–1953. It sought to restore an independent state of Lithuania, to consolidate democracy by destroying communism in the country, returning national values and the freedom of religion. About 50,000 Lithuanians took to the forests and fought Soviet occupants with a gun in their hands. In the later stages of the partisan war, Lithuanians formed the Union of Lithuanian Freedom Fighters and its leader Jonas Žemaitis (codename Vytautas) was posthumously recognized as the president of Lithuania. Despite the fact that the guerrilla warfare did not achieve its goal of liberating Lithuania and that it resulted in more than 20,000 deaths, the armed resistance de facto demonstrated that Lithuania did not voluntarily join the USSR and it also legitimized the will of the people of Lithuania to be independent. Lithuanian courts and the ECHR both treat the Soviets' annihilation of the Lithuanian partisans as a genocide.

Even with the suppression of partisan resistance, the Soviet government failed to stop the movement for the independence of Lithuania. The underground dissident groups were active publishing the underground press and Catholic literature. The most active participants of the movement included Vincentas Sladkevičius, Sigitas Tamkevičius and Nijolė Sadūnaitė. In 1972, after Romas Kalanta's public self-immolation, the unrest in Kaunas lasted for several days.

The Helsinki Group, which was founded in Lithuania after the international conference in Helsinki (Finland), where the post-WWII borders were acknowledged, announced a declaration for Lithuania's independence on foreign radio station. The Helsinki Group informed the Western world about the situation in the Soviet Lithuania and violations of human rights. With the beginning of the increased openness and transparency in government institutions and activities (glasnost) in the Soviet Union, on 3 June 1988, the Sąjūdis was established in Lithuania with Romualdas Ozolas acting as the key figure of the movement. Very soon it began to seek the country's independence. Eventually, Vytautas Landsbergis became the movement's leader. The supporters of Sąjūdis joined movement's groups all over Lithuania. On 23 August 1988 a big rally took place at the Vingis Park in Vilnius. It was attended by approx. 250,000 people. A year later, on 23 August 1989 commemorating the 50th anniversary of the Molotov-Ribbentrop Pact and aiming to draw the attention of the whole world to the occupation of the Baltic states, a political demonstration, the Baltic Way, was organized.

1990–present

On 11 March 1990, the Supreme Council announced the restoration of Lithuania's independence. Lithuania became the first Soviet-occupied state to announce the restitution of independence. On 20 April 1990, the Soviets imposed an economic blockade by ceasing to deliver supplies of raw materials (primarily oil) to Lithuania. Not only the domestic industry, but also the population started feeling the lack of fuel, essential goods, and even hot water. Although the blockade lasted for 74 days, Lithuania did not renounce the declaration of independence.

Gradually, economic relations had been restored. However, tensions had peaked again in January 1991. At that time, attempts were made to carry out a coup using the Soviet Armed Forces, the Internal Army of the Ministry of Internal Affairs and the USSR Committee for State Security (KGB). Because of the poor economic situation in Lithuania, the forces in Moscow thought the coup d'état would receive strong public support.

People from all over Lithuania flooded to Vilnius to defend their legitimately elected Supreme Council of the Republic of Lithuania and independence. The coup ended with a few casualties of peaceful civilians and caused huge material loss. Not a single person who defended Lithuanian Parliament or other state institutions used a weapon, but the Soviet Army did. Soviet soldiers killed 14 people and injured hundreds. A large part of the Lithuanian population participated in the January Events. Shortly after, on 11 February 1991, the Icelandic parliament voted to confirm that Iceland's 1922 recognition of Lithuanian independence was still in full effect, as it never formally recognized the Soviet Union's control over Lithuania, and that full diplomatic relations should be established as soon as possible.

On 31 July 1991, Soviet paramilitaries killed seven Lithuanian border guards on the Belarusian border in what became known as the Medininkai Massacre. On 17 September 1991, Lithuania was admitted to the United Nations.

On 25 October 1992, the citizens of Lithuania voted in a referendum to adopt the current constitution. On 14 February 1993, during the direct general elections, Algirdas Brazauskas became the first president after the restoration of independence of Lithuania. On 31 August 1993 the last units of the Soviet Army left the territory of Lithuania.

On 31 May 2001, Lithuania joined the World Trade Organization (WTO). Since 29 March 2004, Lithuania has been part of NATO. On 1 May 2004, it became a fully-fledged member of the European Union, and a member of the Schengen Agreement on 21 December 2007. On 1 January 2015, Lithuania joined the eurozone and adopted the European Union's single currency as the last of the Baltic states. On 4 July 2018, Lithuania officially joined OECD.

Dalia Grybauskaitė (2009–2019) was the first female President of Lithuania and the first president to be re-elected for a second consecutive term.

On 24 February 2022, Lithuania declared the state of emergency in response to 2022 Russian invasion of Ukraine. Together with the eight other NATO member states, the country also invoked NATO Article 4 to hold consultations on security.

Geography

It lies between latitudes 53° and 57° N, and mostly between longitudes 21° and 27° E (part of the Curonian Spit lies west of 21°). The rest of the coast is sheltered by the Curonian sand peninsula. Lithuania's major warm-water port, Klaipėda, lies at the narrow mouth of the Curonian Lagoon (Lithuanian: Kuršių marios), a shallow lagoon extending south to Kaliningrad. The country's main and largest river, the Nemunas River, and some of its tributaries carry international shipping.

Lithuania lies at the edge of the North European Plain. Its landscape was smoothed by the glaciers of the last ice age, and is a combination of moderate lowlands and highlands. The terrain features numerous lakes (Lake Vištytis, for example) and wetlands, and a mixed forest zone covers over 33% of the country. Drūkšiai is the largest, Tauragnas is the deepest and Asveja is the longest lake in Lithuania.

Affholder accomplished this by calculating the centre of gravity of the geometrical figure of Europe.

Climate

Lithuania has a temperate climate with both maritime and continental influences. It is defined as humid continental (Dfb) under the Köppen climate classification (but is close to oceanic in a narrow coastal zone).

Some winters can be very cold.  occurs almost every winter.

Snow occurs every year, it can snow from October to April. In some years sleet can fall in September or May. The growing season lasts 202 days in the western part of the country and 169 days in the eastern part. Severe storms are rare in the eastern part of Lithuania but common in the coastal areas.

The longest records of measured temperature in the Baltic area cover about 250 years. The data show warm periods during the latter half of the 18th century, and that the 19th century was a relatively cool period. An early 20th-century warming culminated in the 1930s, followed by a smaller cooling that lasted until the 1960s. A warming trend has persisted since then.

Lithuania experienced a drought in 2002, causing forest and peat bog fires.

Environment

After the restoration of Lithuania's independence in 1990, the Aplinkos apsaugos įstatymas (Environmental Protection Act) was adopted already in 1992. The law provided the foundations for regulating social relations in the field of environmental protection, established the basic rights and obligations of legal and natural persons in preserving the biodiversity inherent in Lithuania, ecological systems and the landscape. Lithuania agreed to cut carbon emissions by at least 20% of 1990 levels by 2020 and by at least 40% by 2030, together with all European Union members. Also, by 2020 at least 20% (27% by 2030) of the country's total energy consumption should be from the renewable energy sources. In 2016, Lithuania introduced especially effective container deposit legislation, which resulted in collecting 92% of all packagings in 2017.

Lithuania does not have high mountains and its landscape is dominated by blooming meadows, dense forests and fertile fields of cereals. However it stands out by the abundance of hillforts, which previously had castles where the ancient Lithuanians burned altars for pagan gods. Lithuania is a particularly watered region with more than 3,000 lakes, mostly in the northeast. The country is also drained by numerous rivers, most notably the longest Nemunas. Lithuania is home to two terrestrial ecoregions: Central European mixed forests and Sarmatic mixed forests.

Forest has long been one of the most important natural resources in Lithuania. Forests occupy one third of the country's territory and timber-related industrial production accounts for almost 11% industrial production in the country. Lithuania has five national parks, 30 regional parks, 402 nature reserves, 668 state-protected natural heritage objects.

In 2018 Lithuania was ranked fifth, second to Sweden (first 3 places were not granted) in the Climate Change Performance Index (CCPI). It had a 2019 Forest Landscape Integrity Index mean score of 1.62/10, ranking it 162nd globally out of 172 countries.

Biodiversity

Lithuanian ecosystems include natural and semi-natural (forests, bogs, wetlands and meadows), and anthropogenic (agrarian and urban) ecosystems. Among natural ecosystems, forests are particularly important to Lithuania, covering 33% of the country's territory. Wetlands (raised bogs, fens, transitional mires, etc.) cover 7.9% of the country, with 70% of wetlands having been lost due to drainage and peat extraction between 1960 and 1980. Changes in wetland plant communities resulted in the replacement of moss and grass communities by trees and shrubs, and fens not directly affected by land reclamation have become drier as a result of a drop in the water table. There are 29,000 rivers with a total length of 64,000 km in Lithuania, the Nemunas River basin occupying 74% of the territory of the country. Due to the construction of dams, approximately 70% of spawning sites of potential catadromous fish species have disappeared. In some cases, river and lake ecosystems continue to be impacted by anthropogenic eutrophication.

Agricultural land comprises 54% of Lithuania's territory (roughly 70% of that is arable land and 30% meadows and pastures), approximately 400,000 ha of agricultural land is not farmed, and acts as an ecological niche for weeds and invasive plant species. Habitat deterioration is occurring in regions with very productive and expensive lands as crop areas are expanded. Currently, 18.9% of all plant species, including 1.87% of all known fungi species and 31% of all known species of lichens, are listed in the Lithuanian Red Data Book. The list also contains 8% of all fish species.

The wildlife populations have rebounded as the hunting became more restricted and urbanization allowed replanting forests (forests already tripled in size since their lows). Currently, Lithuania has approximately 250,000 larger wild animals or 5 per each square kilometre. The most prolific large wild animal in every part of Lithuania is the roe deer, with 120,000 of them. They are followed by boars (55,000). Other ungulates are the deer (~22,000), fallow-deer (~21,000) and the largest one: moose (~7,000). Among the Lithuanian predators, foxes are the most common (~27,000). Wolves are, however, more ingrained into the mythology as there are just 800 in Lithuania. Even rarer are the lynxes (~200). The large animals mentioned above exclude the rabbit, ~200,000 of which may live in the Lithuanian forests.

Government and politics

Government
Since Lithuania declared the restoration of its independence on 11 March 1990, it has maintained strong democratic traditions. It held its first independent general elections on 25 October 1992, in which 56.75% of voters supported the new constitution. There were intense debates concerning the constitution, particularly the role of the president. A separate referendum was held on 23 May 1992 to gauge public opinion on the matter, and 41% of voters supported the restoration of the President of Lithuania. Through compromise, a semi-presidential system was agreed on.

The Lithuanian head of state is the president, directly elected for a five-year term and serving a maximum of two terms. The president oversees foreign affairs and national security, and is the commander-in-chief of the military. The president also appoints the prime minister and, on the latter's nomination, the rest of the cabinet, as well as a number of other top civil servants and the judges for all courts except the Constitutional Court. The current Lithuanian head of state, Gitanas Nausėda was elected on 26 May 2019 by unanimously winning in all municipalities of Lithuania on the second election tour.

The judges of the Constitutional Court (Konstitucinis Teismas) serve nine-year terms. The court is renewed by a third every three years. The judges are appointed by the Seimas, on the nomination of the President, Chairman of the Seimas, and the Chairman of the Supreme Court,. The unicameral Lithuanian parliament, the Seimas, has 141 members who are elected to four-year terms. 71 of the members of its members are elected in single-member constituencies, and the others in a nationwide vote by proportional representation. A party must receive at least 5% of the national vote to be eligible for any of the 70 national seats in the Seimas.

Political parties and elections

Lithuania was one of the first countries in the world to grant women a right to vote in the elections. Lithuanian women were allowed to vote by the 1918 Constitution of Lithuania and used their newly granted right for the first time in 1919. By doing so, Lithuania allowed it earlier than such democratic countries as the United States (1920), France (1945), Greece (1952), Switzerland (1971).

Lithuania exhibits a fragmented multi-party system, with a number of small parties in which coalition governments are common. Ordinary elections to the Seimas take place on the second Sunday of October every four years. To be eligible for election, candidates must be at least 25 years old on the election day, not under allegiance to a foreign state and permanently reside in Lithuania. Persons serving or due to serve a sentence imposed by the court 65 days before the election are not eligible. Also, judges, citizens performing military service, and servicemen of professional military service and officials of statutory institutions and establishments may not stand for election. Homeland Union – Lithuanian Christian Democrats won the 2020 Lithuanian parliamentary elections and gained 50 of 141 seats in the parliament. In October 2020, the prime ministerial candidate of Homeland Union-Lithuanian Christian Democrats (TS-LKD) Ingrida Šimonytė formed a centre-right coalition with two liberal parties.

The President of Lithuania is the head of state of the country, elected to a five-year term in a majority vote. Elections take place on the last Sunday no more than two months before the end of current presidential term. To be eligible for election, candidates must be at least 40 years old on the election day and reside in Lithuania for at least three years, in addition to satisfying the eligibility criteria for a member of the parliament. Same President may serve for not more than two terms. Gitanas Nausėda has won the most recent election as an independent candidate in 2019.

Each municipality in Lithuania is governed by a municipal council and a mayor, who is a member of the municipal council. The number of members, elected on a four-year term, in each municipal council depends on the size of the municipality and varies from 15 (in municipalities with fewer than 5,000 residents) to 51 (in municipalities with more than 500,000 residents). 1,524 municipal council members were elected in 2015. Members of the council, with the exception of the mayor, are elected using proportional representation. Starting with 2015, the mayor is elected directly by the majority of residents of the municipality. Social Democratic Party of Lithuania won most of the positions in the 2015 elections (372 municipal councils seats and 16 mayors).

As of 2019, the number of seats in the European Parliament allocated to Lithuania was 11. Ordinary elections take place on a Sunday on the same day as in other EU countries. The vote is open to all citizens of Lithuania, as well as citizens of other EU countries that permanently reside in Lithuania, who are at least 18 years old on the election day. To be eligible for election, candidates must be at least 21 years old on the election day, a citizen of Lithuania or a citizen of another EU country permanently residing in Lithuania. Candidates are not allowed to stand for election in more than one country. Persons serving or due to serve a sentence imposed by the court 65 days before the election are not eligible. Also, judges, citizens performing military service, and servicemen of professional military service and officials of statutory institutions and establishments may not stand for election. Six political parties and one committee representatives gained seats in the 2019 elections.

Law and law enforcement

The first attempt to codify the Lithuanian laws was in 1468 when the Casimir's Code was compiled and adopted by Grand Duke Casimir IV Jagiellon. In the 16th century three editions of the Statutes of Lithuania were created with the First Statute being adopted in 1529, the Second Statute in 1566, and the Third Statute in 1588. On 3 May 1791, the Europe's first and the world's second Constitution was adopted by the Great Sejm. The Third Statute was partly in force in the territory of Lithuania even until 1840, despite the Third Partition of the Polish–Lithuanian Commonwealth in 1795.

In 1934–1935, Lithuania held the first mass trial of the Nazis in Europe, the convicted were sentenced to imprisonment in a heavy labor prison and capital punishments.

After regaining of independence in 1990, the largely modified Soviet legal codes were in force for about a decade. The current Constitution of Lithuania was adopted on 25 October 1992. In 2001, the Civil Code of Lithuania was passed in Seimas. It was succeeded by the Criminal Code and Criminal Procedure Code in 2003. The approach to the criminal law is inquisitorial, as opposed to adversarial; it is generally characterised by an insistence on formality and rationalisation, as opposed to practicality and informality. Normative legal act enters into force on the next day after its publication in the Teisės aktų registras, unless it has a later entry into force date.

The European Union law is an integral part of the Lithuanian legal system since 1 May 2004.

Lithuania, after breaking away from the Soviet Union, had a difficult crime situation, however, the Lithuanian law enforcement agencies fought crime over the years, making Lithuania a reasonably safe country. Crime in Lithuania has been declining rapidly. Law enforcement in Lithuania is primarily the responsibility of local Lietuvos policija (Lithuanian Police) commissariats. They are supplemented by the Lietuvos policijos antiteroristinių operacijų rinktinė Aras (Anti-Terrorist Operations Team of the Lithuanian Police Aras), Lietuvos kriminalinės policijos biuras (Lithuanian Criminal Police Bureau), Lietuvos policijos kriminalistinių tyrimų centras (Lithuanian Police Forensic Research Center) and Lietuvos kelių policijos tarnyba (Lithuanian Road Police Service).

In 2017, there were 63,846 crimes registered in Lithuania. Of these, thefts comprised a large part with 19,630 cases (13.2% less than in 2016). While 2,835 crimes were serious and very serious (crimes that may lead to more than six years imprisonment), which is 14.5% less than in 2016. In total, 129 homicides or attempted homicide occurred (19.9% less than in 2016), while serious bodily harm was registered 178 times (17.6% less than in 2016). Another problematic crime contraband cases also decreased by 27.2% from 2016 numbers. Meanwhile, crimes in electronic data and information technology security fields noticeably increased by 26.6%. In the 2013 Special Eurobarometer, 29% of Lithuanians said that corruption affects their daily lives (EU average 26%). Moreover, 95% of Lithuanians regarded corruption as widespread in their country (EU average 76%), and 88% agreed that bribery and the use of connections is often the easiest way of obtaining certain public services (EU average 73%). Though, according to local branch of Transparency International, corruption levels have been decreasing over the past decade.

Capital punishment in Lithuania was suspended in 1996 and fully eliminated in 1998. Lithuania has the highest number of prison inmates in the EU. According to scientist Gintautas Sakalauskas, this is not because of a high criminality rate in the country, but due to Lithuania's high repression level and the lack of trust of the convicted, who are frequently sentenced to a jail imprisonment.

Administrative divisions

The current system of administrative division was established in 1994 and modified in 2000 to meet the requirements of the European Union. The country's 10 counties (Lithuanian: singular – apskritis, plural – apskritys) are subdivided into 60 municipalities (Lithuanian: singular – savivaldybė, plural – savivaldybės), and further divided into 500 elderships (Lithuanian: singular – seniūnija, plural – seniūnijos).

Municipalities have been the most important unit of administration in Lithuania since the system of county governorship (apskrities viršininkas) was dissolved in 2010. Some municipalities are historically called "district municipalities" (often shortened to "district"), while others are called "city municipalities" (sometimes shortened to "city"). Each has its own elected government. The election of municipality councils originally occurred every three years, but now takes place every four years. The council appoints elders to govern the elderships. Mayors have been directly elected since 2015; prior to that, they were appointed by the council.

Elderships, numbering over 500, are the smallest administrative units and do not play a role in national politics. They provide necessary local public services—for example, registering births and deaths in rural areas. They are most active in the social sector, identifying needy individuals or families and organizing and distributing welfare and other forms of relief. Some citizens feel that elderships have no real power and receive too little attention, and that they could otherwise become a source of local initiative for addressing rural problems.

Foreign relations

Lithuania became a member of the United Nations on 18 September 1991, and is a signatory to a number of its organizations and other international agreements. It is also a member of the European Union, the Council of Europe, Organization for Security and Cooperation in Europe, as well as NATO and its adjunct North Atlantic Coordinating Council. Lithuania gained membership in the World Trade Organization on 31 May 2001, and joined the OECD on 5 July 2018, while also seeking membership in other Western organizations.

Lithuania has established diplomatic relations with 149 countries.

In 2011, Lithuania hosted the Organization for Security and Co-operation in Europe Ministerial Council Meeting. During the second half of 2013, Lithuania assumed the role of the presidency of the European Union.

Lithuania is also active in developing cooperation among northern European countries. It is a member of the interparliamentary Baltic Assembly, the intergovernmental Baltic Council of Ministers and the Council of the Baltic Sea States.

Lithuania also cooperates with Nordic and the two other Baltic countries through the NB8 format. A similar format, NB6, unites Nordic and Baltic members of EU. NB6's focus is to discuss and agree on positions before presenting them to the Council of the European Union and at the meetings of EU foreign affairs ministers.

The Council of the Baltic Sea States (CBSS) was established in Copenhagen in 1992 as an informal regional political forum. Its main aim is to promote integration and to close contacts between the region's countries. The members of CBSS are Iceland, Sweden, Denmark, Norway, Finland, Germany, Lithuania, Latvia, Estonia, Poland, Russia, and the European Commission. Its observer states are Belarus, France, Italy, Netherlands, Romania, Slovakia, Spain, the United States, the United Kingdom, and Ukraine.

The Nordic Council of Ministers and Lithuania engage in political cooperation to attain mutual goals and to determine new trends and possibilities for joint cooperation. The council's information office aims to disseminate Nordic concepts and to demonstrate and promote Nordic cooperation.

Lithuania, together with the five Nordic countries and the two other Baltic countries, is a member of the Nordic Investment Bank (NIB) and cooperates in its NORDPLUS programme, which is committed to education.

The Baltic Development Forum (BDF) is an independent nonprofit organization that unites large companies, cities, business associations and institutions in the Baltic Sea region. In 2010 the BDF's 12th summit was held in Vilnius.

Poland was highly supportive of Lithuanian independence, despite Lithuania's discriminatory treatment of its Polish minority. The former Solidarity leader and Polish President Lech Wałęsa criticised the government of Lithuania over discrimination against the Polish minority and rejected Lithuania's Order of Vytautas the Great. Lithuania maintains greatly warm mutual relations with Georgia and strongly supports its European Union and NATO aspirations. During the Russo-Georgian War in 2008, when the Russian troops were occupying the territory of Georgia and approaching towards the Georgian capital Tbilisi, President Valdas Adamkus, together with the Polish and Ukrainian presidents, went to Tbilisi by answering to the Georgians request of the international assistance. Shortly, Lithuanians and the Lithuanian Catholic Church also began collecting financial support for the war victims.

In 2004–2009, Dalia Grybauskaitė served as European Commissioner for Financial Programming and the Budget within the José Manuel Barroso-led Commission.

In 2013, Lithuania was elected to the United Nations Security Council for a two-year term, becoming the first Baltic country elected to this post. During its membership, Lithuania actively supported Ukraine and often condemned Russia for the war in Ukraine, immediately earning vast Ukrainians esteem. As the War in Donbas progressed, President Dalia Grybauskaitė has compared the Russian President Vladimir Putin to Josef Stalin and to Adolf Hitler, she has also called Russia a "terrorist state".
In 2018 Lithuania, along with Latvia and Estonia were awarded the  – for their exceptional model of democratic development and contribution to peace in the continent. In 2019 Lithuania condemned the Turkish offensive into north-eastern Syria. In December 2021, Lithuania reported that in an escalation of the diplomatic spat with China over its relations with Taiwan, China had stopped all imports from Lithuania.

The 2023 NATO summit will be held in the Lithuanian capital Vilnius.

Lithuania’s president Gitanas Nausėda called for more NATO troops on 22 April 2022, saying NATO should increase its deployment of troops in Lithuania and elsewhere on Europe's eastern flank following Russia's invasion of Ukraine, during a meeting in Vilnius.

Military

The Lithuanian Armed Forces is the name for the unified armed forces of Lithuanian Land Force, Lithuanian Air Force, Lithuanian Naval Force, Lithuanian Special Operations Force and other units: Logistics Command, Training and Doctrine Command, Headquarters Battalion, Military Police. Directly subordinated to the Chief of Defence are the Special Operations Forces and Military Police. The Reserve Forces are under command of the Lithuanian National Defence Volunteer Forces.

The Lithuanian Armed Forces consist of some 20,000 active personnel, which may be supported by reserve forces. Compulsory conscription ended in 2008 but was reintroduced in 2015. The Lithuanian Armed Forces currently have deployed personnel on international missions in Afghanistan, Kosovo, Mali and Somalia.

Lithuania became a full member of NATO in March 2004. Fighter jets of NATO members are deployed in Šiauliai Air Base and provide safety for the Baltic airspace.

Since the summer of 2005, Lithuania has been part of the International Security Assistance Force in Afghanistan (ISAF), leading a Provincial Reconstruction Team (PRT) in the town of Chaghcharan in the province of Ghor. The PRT includes personnel from Denmark, Iceland and the US. There are also special operation forces units in Afghanistan, placed in Kandahar Province. Since joining international operations in 1994, Lithuania has lost two soldiers: Lt. Normundas Valteris fell in Bosnia, as his patrol vehicle drove over a mine. Sgt. Arūnas Jarmalavičius was fatally wounded during an attack on the camp of his Provincial Reconstruction Team in Afghanistan.

The Lithuanian National Defence Policy aims to guarantee the preservation of the independence and sovereignty of the state, the integrity of its land, territorial waters and airspace, and its constitutional order. Its main strategic goals are to defend the country's interests, and to maintain and expand the capabilities of its armed forces so they may contribute to and participate in the missions of NATO and European Union member states.

The defense ministry is responsible for combat forces, search and rescue, and intelligence operations. The 5,000 border guards fall under the Interior Ministry's supervision and are responsible for border protection, passport and customs duties, and share responsibility with the navy for smuggling and drug trafficking interdiction. A special security department handles VIP protection and communications security. In 2015 National Cyber Security Centre of Lithuania was created. Paramilitary organisation Lithuanian Riflemen's Union acts as a civilian self-defence institution.

According to NATO, in 2020, Lithuania allocated 2.13% of its GDP to the national defense. For a long time, especially after the global financial crisis in 2008, Lithuania lagged behind NATO allies in terms of defence spending. However, in recent years it has begun to rapidly increase the funding, exceeding the NATO guideline of 2% in 2019.

Economy

Lithuania has an open and mixed economy that is classified as high-income economy by the World Bank. 
According to data from 2016, the three largest sectors in Lithuanian economy are – services (68.3% of GDP), industry (28.5%) and agriculture (3.3%). World Economic Forum's Global Competitiveness Report ranks Lithuania 41st (of 137 ranked countries).

Lithuania joined NATO in 2004, EU in 2004, Schengen in 2007 and OECD in 2018.

On 1 January 2015, the euro became the national currency, replacing litas at the rate of EUR 1.00 = LTL 3.45280.

Agricultural products and food comprise 18.3% of exports; other major sectors include chemical products and plastics (17.8%), machinery and appliances (15.8%), mineral products (14.7%), wood and furniture (12.5%). According to data from 2016, more than half of all Lithuanian exports go to 7 countries including Russia (14%), Latvia (9.9%), Poland (9.1%), Germany (7.7%), Estonia (5.3%), Sweden (4.8%) and United Kingdom (4.3%). Exports equaled 81.31 percent of Lithuania's GDP in 2017.

Lithuanian GDP experienced very high real growth rates for decade up to 2009, peaking at 11.1% in 2007. As a result, the country was often termed as a Baltic Tiger. However, in 2009 due to a global financial crisis marked experienced a drastic decline – GDP contracted by 14.9% and unemployment rate reached 17.8% in 2010. After the decline of 2009, Lithuanian annual economic growth has been much slower compared to pre-2009 years. According to IMF, financial conditions are conducive to growth and financial soundness indicators remain strong. The public debt ratio in 2016 fell to 40 percent of GDP, to compare with 42.7 in 2015 (before global finance crisis – 15 percent of GDP in 2008).

On average, more than 95% of all foreign direct investment in Lithuania comes from European Union countries. Sweden is historically the largest investor with 20% – 30% of all FDI in Lithuania. FDI into Lithuania spiked in 2017, reaching its highest ever recorded number of greenfield investment projects. In 2017, Lithuania was third country, after Ireland and Singapore by the average job value of investment projects.
The US was the leading source country in 2017, 24.59% of total FDI. Next up are Germany and the UK, each representing 11.48% of total project numbers. Based on the Eurostat's data, in 2017, the value of Lithuanian exports recorded the most rapid growth not only in the Baltic countries, but also across Europe, which was 16.9 per cent.

In the period between 2004 and 2016, one out of five Lithuanians emigrated, primarily due to insufficient income for residents; secondarily seeking to study abroad. Long term emigration and economy growth has resulted in a noticeable shortage in the labor market and growth in salaries being larger than growth in labor efficiency. Unemployment rate in 2017 was 8.1%.

As of 2021, Lithuanian median wealth per adult was $28,400 (mean was $63,500), while the total national wealth was $138 billion. As of December 2022, the average monthly gross salary in Lithuania was €2,042. Although, cost of living in the country also is sufficiently less with the price level for household final consumption expenditure (HFCE) – 63, being 39% lower than EU average – 102 in 2016.

Lithuania has a flat tax rate rather than a progressive scheme. According to Eurostat, the personal income tax (15%) and corporate tax (15%) rates in Lithuania are among the lowest in the EU. The country has the lowest implicit rate of tax on capital (9.8%) in the EU. Corporate tax rate in Lithuania is 15% and 5% for small businesses. 7 Free Economic Zones are operating in Lithuania.

Information technology production is growing in the country, reaching €1.9 billion in 2016. In 2017 only, 35
 FinTech companies came to Lithuania – a result of Lithuanian government and Bank of Lithuania simplified procedures for obtaining licences for the activities of e-money and payment institutions. Europe's first international Blockchain Centre launched in Vilnius in 2018. Lithuania has granted a total of 39 e-money licenses, second in the EU only to the U.K. with 128 licenses. In 2018 Google set up a payment company in Lithuania.

Companies
Largest companies of Lithuania in 2021, by revenue:

Agriculture

Agriculture in Lithuania dates to the Neolithic period, about 3,000 to 1,000 BC. It has been one of Lithuania's most important occupations for many centuries. Lithuania's accession to the European Union in 2004 ushered in a new agricultural era. The EU pursues a very high standard of food safety and purity. In 1999, the Seimas (parliament) of Lithuania adopted a Law on Product Safety, and in 2000 it adopted a Law on Food. The reform of the agricultural market has been carried out on the basis of these two laws.

In 2016, agricultural production in Lithuania was €2.29 billion. Cereal crops occupied the largest part of it (5709.7 tons), other significant types include: sugar beets (933.9 tons), rapeseed (392.5 tons) and potatoes (340.2 tons). Products totaling €4,385.2 million were exported from Lithuania to foreign markets, of which products for €3,165.2 million were Lithuanian origin. Export of agricultural and food products accounted for 19.4% of all exports of goods from the country.

Organic farming is constantly becoming more popular in Lithuania. The status of organic growers and producers in the country is granted by the public body Ekoagros. In 2016, there were 2539 such farms that occupied 225,541.78 hectares. Of these, 43.13% were cereals, 31.22% were perennial grasses, 13.9% were leguminous crops and 11.75% were others.

Science and technology

Foundation of the University of Vilnius in 1579 was a major factor of establishing local scientist community in Lithuania and making connections with other universities and scientists of Europe. Georg Forster, Jean-Emmanuel Gilibert, Johann Peter Frank and many other visiting scientists have worked at University of Vilnius.
Lithuanian bajoras and Grand Duchy of Lithuania artillery expert Kazimieras Simonavičius is a pioneer of rocketry, who has published Artis Magnae Artilleriae in 1650 that for over two centuries was used in Europe as a basic artillery manual and contains a large chapter on caliber, construction, production and properties of rockets (for military and civil purposes), including multistage rockets, batteries of rockets, and rockets with delta wing stabilizers. A botanist Jurgis Pabrėža (1771–1849), created first systematic guide of Lithuanian flora Taislius auguminis (Botany), written in Samogitian dialect, the Latin-Lithuanian dictionary of plant names, first Lithuanian textbook of geography. German scientist Theodor Grotthuss (1785–1822), who proposed the Grotthuss mechanism, lived and worked in the  where he gained prominence amongst the locals for his effort in educating the peasants and improving their well-being.

During the Interwar period humanitarian and social scientists emerged such as Vosylius Sezemanas, Levas Karsavinas, Mykolas Römeris.
Due to the World Wars, Lithuanian science and scientists suffered heavily from the occupants, however some of them reached a world-class achievements in their lifetime. Most notably, Antanas Gustaitis, Vytautas Andrius Graičiūnas, Marija Gimbutas, Birutė Galdikas, A. J. Kliorė, Algirdas Julien Greimas, medievalist Jurgis Baltrušaitis, Algirdas Antanas Avižienis.
Jonas Kubilius, long-term rector of the University of Vilnius is known for works in Probabilistic number theory, Kubilius model, Theorem of Kubilius and Turán–Kubilius inequality bear his name. Jonas Kubilius successfully resisted attempts to Russify the University of Vilnius.

Nowadays, the country is among moderate innovators group in the International Innovation Index.
and in the European Innovation Scoreboard ranked 15th among EU countries. Lithuania was ranked 39th in the Global Innovation Index in 2021

Lasers and biotechnology are flagship fields of the Lithuanian science and high tech industry. Lithuanian "Šviesos konversija" (Light Conversion) has developed a femtosecond laser system that has 80% marketshare worldwide, and is used in DNA research, ophthalmological surgeries, nanotech industry and science. Vilnius University Laser Research Center has developed one of the most powerful femtosecond lasers in the world dedicated primarily to oncological diseases. In 1963, Vytautas Straižys and his coworkers created Vilnius photometric system that is used in astronomy. Noninvasive intracranial pressure and blood flow measuring devices were developed by KTU scientist A. Ragauskas. K.Pyragas contributed to Control of chaos with his way of delayed feedback control – Pyragas method. Kavli Prize laureate Virginijus Šikšnys is known for his discoveries in CRISPR field – invention of CRISPR-Cas9.

Lithuania has launched three satellites to space: LitSat-1, Lituanica SAT-1 and LituanicaSAT-2. Lithuanian Museum of Ethnocosmology and Molėtai Astronomical Observatory is located in Kulionys. 15 R&D institutions are members of Lithuanian Space Association; Lithuania is a cooperating state with European Space Agency. Rimantas Stankevičius is the only ethnically Lithuanian astronaut.

Lithuania in 2018 became Associated Member State of CERN. Two CERN incubators in Vilnius and Kaunas will be hosted.

Most advanced scientific research in Lithuania is being conducted at the Life Sciences Center, Center For Physical Sciences and Technology.

As of 2016 calculations, yearly growth of Lithuania's biotech and life science sector was 22% over the past 5 years. 16 academic institutions, 15 R&D centres (science parks and innovation valleys) and more than 370 manufacturers operate in the Lithuanian life science and biotech industry.

In 2008 the Valley development programme was started aiming to upgrade Lithuanian scientific research infrastructure and encourage business and science cooperation. Five R&D Valleys were launched – Jūrinis (maritime technologies), Nemunas (agro, bioenergy, forestry), Saulėtekis (laser and light, semiconductor), Santara (biotechnology, medicine), Santaka (sustainable chemistry and pharmacy). Lithuanian Innovation Center is created to provide support for innovations and research institutions.

Tourism

Statistics from 2016 showed that 1.49 million tourists from foreign countries visited Lithuania and spent at least one night in the country. The largest number of tourists came from Germany (174,800), Belarus (171,900), Russia (150,600), Poland (148,400), Latvia (134,400), Ukraine (84,000), and the UK (58,200).

The total contribution of Travel & Tourism to country GDP was €2,005.5 million, 5.3% of GDP in 2016, and is forecast to rise by 7.3% in 2017, and to rise by 4.2% pa to €3,243.5 million, 6.7% of GDP in 2027. Hot air ballooning is very popular in Lithuania, especially in Vilnius and Trakai. Bicycle tourism is growing, especially in Lithuanian Seaside Cycle Route. EuroVelo routes EV10, EV11, EV13 go through Lithuania. Total length of bicycle tracks amounts to 
3769 km (of which 1988 km is asphalt pavement).

Nemunas Delta Regional Park and Žuvintas biosphere reserve are known for birdwatching.

Domestic tourism has been on the rise as well. Currently there are up to 1000 places of attraction in Lithuania. Most tourists visit the big cities—Vilnius, Klaipėda, and Kaunas, seaside resorts, such as Neringa, Palanga, and Spa towns – Druskininkai, Birštonas.

Infrastructure

Communication

Lithuania has a well developed communications infrastructure. The country has 2.8 million citizens and 5 million SIM cards. The largest LTE (4G) mobile network covers 97% of Lithuania's territory. Usage of fixed phone lines has been rapidly decreasing due to rapid expansion of mobile-cellular services.

In 2017, Lithuania was top 30 in the world by average mobile broadband speeds and top 20 by average fixed broadband speeds.
Lithuania was also top 7 in 2017 in the List of countries by 4G LTE penetration. In 2016, Lithuania was ranked 17th in United Nations' e-participation index.

There are four TIER III datacenters in Lithuania.
Lithuania is 44th globally ranked country on data center density according to Cloudscene.

Long-term project (2005–2013) – Development of Rural Areas Broadband Network (RAIN) was started with the objective to provide residents, state and municipal authorities and businesses with fibre-optic broadband access in rural areas. RAIN infrastructure allows 51 communications operators to provide network services to their clients. The project was funded by the European Union and the Lithuanian government. 72% of Lithuanian households have access to internet, a number which in 2017 was among EU's lowest and in 2016 ranked 97th by CIA World Factbook. Number of households with internet access is expected to increase and reach 77% by 2021. Almost 50% of Lithuanians had smartphones in 2016, a number that is expected to increase to 65% by 2022.
Lithuania has the highest FTTH (Fiber to the home) penetration rate in Europe (36.8% in September 2016) according to FTTH Council Europe.

Transport

Lithuania received its first railway connection in the middle of the 19th century, when the Warsaw – Saint Petersburg Railway was constructed. It included a stretch from Daugavpils via Vilnius and Kaunas to Virbalis. The first and only still operating tunnel was completed in 1860.

This railway network is incompatible with European standard gauge and requires train switching. However, Lithuanian railway network also has  of standard gauge lines. More than half of all inland freight transported in Lithuania is carried by rail. The Trans-European standard gauge Rail Baltica railway, linking Helsinki–Tallinn–Riga–Kaunas–Warsaw and continuing on to Berlin is under construction. In 2017, Lietuvos Geležinkeliai, a company that operates most railway lines in Lithuania, received EU penalty for breaching EU's antitrust laws and restricting competition.

Transportation is the third largest sector in Lithuanian economy. Lithuanian transport companies drew attention in 2016 and 2017 with huge and record-breaking orders of trucks. Almost 90% of commercial truck traffic in Lithuania is international transports, the highest of any EU country.

Lithuania has an extensive network of motorways. WEF grades Lithuanian roads at 4.7 / 7.0 and Lithuanian road authority (LAKD) at 6.5 / 10.0.

The Port of Klaipėda is the only commercial cargo port in Lithuania. In 2011 45.5 million tons of cargo were handled (including Būtingė oil terminal figures) Port of Klaipėda is outside of EU's 20 largest ports, but it is the eighth largest port in the Baltic Sea region
 with ongoing expansion plans.

Vilnius International Airport is the largest airport in Lithuania, 91st busiest airport in Europe (EU's 100 largest airports). It served 3.8 million passengers in 2016. Other international airports include Kaunas International Airport, Palanga International Airport and Šiauliai International Airport. Kaunas International Airport is also a small commercial cargo airport which started regular commercial cargo traffic in 2011. The inland river cargo port in Marvelė, linking Kaunas and Klaipėda, received first cargo in 2019.

Water supply and sanitation

Lithuania has one of the largest fresh water supplies, compared with other countries in Europe. Lithuania and Denmark are the only countries in Europe, which are fully equipped with fresh groundwater. Lithuanians consume about 0.5 million cubic metres of water per day, which is only 12–14 percent of all explored fresh groundwater resources. Water quality in the country is very high and is determined by the fact that drinking water comes from deep layers that are protected from pollution on the surface of the earth. Drilling depth usually reaches 30–50 metres, but in Klaipėda Region it even reaches 250 metres. Consequently, Lithuania is one of very few European countries where groundwater is used for centralized water supply. With a large underground fresh water reserves, Lithuania exports mineral-rich water to other countries. Approved mineral water quantity is about 2.7 million cubic metres per year, while production is only 4–5 percent of all mineral water resources.

Vilnius is the only Baltic capital that uses centralized water supplying from deep water springs, which are protected from pollution and has no nitrates or nitrites that are harmful to the human body. Water is cleaned without chemicals in Lithuania. About 20% of the consumed water in the state is a non-filtered very high quality water.

Energy
 

Systematic diversification of energy imports and resources is Lithuania's key energy strategy. Long-term aims were defined in National Energy Independence strategy in 2012 by Lietuvos Seimas. It was estimated that strategic energy independence initiatives will cost €6.3–7.8 billion in total and provide annual savings of €0.9–1.1 billion.

After the decommissioning of the Ignalina Nuclear Power Plant, Lithuania turned from electricity exporter to electricity importer. Unit No. 1 was closed in December 2004, as a condition of Lithuania's entry into the European Union; Unit No. 2 was closed down on 31 December 2009. Proposals have been made to construct a new – Visaginas Nuclear Power Plant in Lithuania. However, a non-binding referendum held in October 2012 clouded the prospects for the Visaginas project, as 63% of voters said no to a new nuclear power plant.

The country's main primary source of electrical power is Elektrėnai Power Plant. Other primary sources of Lithuania's electrical power are Kruonis Pumped Storage Plant and Kaunas Hydroelectric Power Plant. Kruonis Pumped Storage Plant is the only in the Baltic states power plant to be used for regulation of the power system's operation with generating capacity of 900 MW for at least 12 hours. , 66% of electrical power was imported. First geothermal heating plant (Klaipėda Geothermal Demonstration Plant) in the Baltic Sea region was built in 2004.

Lithuania–Sweden submarine electricity interconnection NordBalt and Lithuania–Poland electricity interconnection LitPol Link were launched at the end of 2015.

In order to break down Gazprom's monopoly in natural gas market of Lithuania, first large scale LNG import terminal (Klaipėda LNG FSRU) in the Baltic region was built in port of Klaipėda in 2014. The Klaipėda LNG terminal was called Independence, thus emphasising the aim to diversify energy market of Lithuania. Norvegian company Equinor supplies  of natural gas annually from 2015 until 2020. The terminal is able to meet the Lithuania's demand 100 percent, and Latvia's and Estonia's national demand 90 percent in the future.

Gas Interconnection Poland–Lithuania (GIPL), also known as Lithuania–Poland pipeline, is a proposed natural gas pipeline interconnection between Lithuania and Poland that is expected to be finished by 2019. In 2018 synchronising the Baltic States' electricity grid with the Synchronous grid of Continental Europe has started.

In 2016, 20.8% of electricity consumed in Lithuania came from renewable sources.

Demographics

Since the Neolithic period the native inhabitants of the Lithuanian territory have not been replaced by any other ethnic group, so there is a high probability that the inhabitants of present-day Lithuania have preserved the genetic composition of their forebears relatively undisturbed by the major demographic movements, although without being actually isolated from them. The Lithuanian population appears to be relatively homogeneous, without apparent genetic differences among ethnic subgroups.

A 2004 analysis of MtDNA in the Lithuanian population revealed that Lithuanians are close to the Slavic and Finno-Ugric speaking populations of Northern and Eastern Europe. Y-chromosome SNP haplogroup analysis showed Lithuanians to be closest to Latvians and Estonians.

In 2021, the age structure of the population was as follows: 0–14 years, 14.86% (male 214,113/female 203,117); 15–64 years: 65.19% (male 896,400/female 934,467); 65 years and over: 19.95% (male 195,269/female 365,014). The median age in 2022 was 44 years (male: 41, female: 47).

Lithuania has a sub-replacement fertility rate: the total fertility rate (TFR) in Lithuania was 1.34 children born/woman in 2021, the mean age of women at childbirth was 30.3 years, that of women at the birth of the first child – 28.2 years. The human sex ratio is male leaning for the age categories 15–44 with 1.0352 males for every female. , 25.6% of births were to unmarried women. The mean age at first marriage in 2021 was 28.3 years for women and 30.5 years for men.

Functional urban areas

Ethnic groups

Ethnic Lithuanians make up about five-sixths of the country's population and Lithuania has the most homogeneous population in the Baltic States. In 2015, the population of Lithuania stands at 2,921,262, 84.2% of whom are ethnic Lithuanians who speak Lithuanian, which is the official language of the country. Several sizeable minorities exist, such as Poles (6.6%), Russians (5.8%), Belarusians (1.2%) and Ukrainians (0.5%).

Poles in Lithuania are the largest minority, concentrated in southeast Lithuania (the Vilnius region). Russians in Lithuania are the second largest minority, concentrated mostly in two cities. They constitute sizeable minorities in Vilnius (12%) and Klaipėda (19.6%), and a majority in the town of Visaginas (52%). About 3,000 Roma live in Lithuania, mostly in Vilnius, Kaunas and Panevėžys; their organizations are supported by the National Minority and Emigration Department. For centuries a small Tatar community has flourished in Lithuania.

The official language is Lithuanian, but in some areas there is a significant presence of minority languages, such as Polish, Russian, Belarusian and Ukrainian. The greatest presence of minorities and the use of these languages is in Šalčininkai District Municipality, Vilnius District Municipality and Visaginas Municipality. Yiddish is spoken by members of the tiny remaining Jewish community in Lithuania. The state laws guarantee education in minority languages and there are numerous publicly funded schools in the areas populated by minorities, with Polish as the language of instruction being the most widely available.

According to the survey carried out within the framework of the Lithuanian census of 2021, 85.33% of the country's population speak Lithuanian as their native language, 6.8% are native speakers of Russian and 5.1% of Polish. , 60.6% of residents speak Russian as a foreign language, 31.1% – English, 10.5% – Lithuanian, 8% – German, 7.9% – Polish, 1.9% – French, 2.6% – various others. Most Lithuanian schools teach English as the first foreign language, but students may also study German, or, in some schools, French or Russian. Around 80% of young people in Lithuania know English.

Urbanization

There has been a steady movement of population to the cities since the 1990s, encouraged by the planning of regional centres, such as Alytus, Marijampolė, Utena, Plungė, and Mažeikiai. By the early 21st century, about two-thirds of the total population lived in urban areas. , 68.19% of the total population lives in urban areas. Lithuania's functional urban areas include Vilnius (population 708,203), Kaunas (population 391,153), and Panevėžys (population 124,526). The fDI of the Financial Times in their research Cities and Regions of the Future 2018/19 ranked Vilnius fourth in the mid-sized European cities category and Vilnius county was ranked 10th in the small European regions category.

Health

Lithuania provides free state-funded healthcare to all citizens and registered long-term residents. It co-exists with a significant private healthcare sector. In 2003–2012, the network of hospitals was restructured, as part of wider healthcare service reforms. It started in 2003–2005 with the expansion of ambulatory services and primary care.
In 2016, Lithuania ranked 27th in Europe in the Euro health consumer index, a ranking of European healthcare systems based on waiting time, results and other indicators.

 Lithuanian life expectancy at birth was 76.0 (71.2 years for males and 80.4 for females) and the infant mortality rate was 2.99 per 1,000 births. The annual population growth rate increased by 0.3% in 2007. Lithuania has seen a dramatic rise in suicides in the 1990s. The suicide rate has been constantly decreasing since, but it still remains the highest in the EU and the OECD. The suicide rate as of 2019 is 20.2 per 100,000 people. Suicide in Lithuania has been a subject of research, but the main reasons behind the high rate are thought to be both psychological and economic, including: social transformations and economic recessions, alcoholism, lack of tolerance in the society, bullying.

By 2000 the vast majority of Lithuanian health care institutions were non-profit-making enterprises and a private sector developed, providing mostly outpatient services which are paid for out-of-pocket. The Ministry of Health also runs a few health care facilities and is involved in the running of the two major Lithuanian teaching hospitals. It is responsible for the State Public Health Centre which manages the public health network including ten county public health centres with their local branches. The ten counties run county hospitals and specialised health care facilities.

There is Compulsory Health Insurance for the Lithuanian residents. There are 5 Territorial Health Insurance Funds, covering Vilnius, Kaunas, Klaipėda, Šiauliai and Panevėžys. Contributions for people who are economically active are 9% of income.

Emergency medical services are provided free of charge to all residents. Access to the secondary and tertiary care, such as hospital treatment, is normally via referral by a general practitioner. Lithuania also has one of the lowest health care prices in Europe.

Religion

According to the 2021 census, 74.2% of residents of Lithuania were Catholics. Catholicism has been the main religion since the official Christianisation of Lithuania in 1387. The Catholic Church was persecuted by the Russian Empire as part of the Russification policies and by the Soviet Union as part of the overall anti-religious campaigns. During the Soviet era, some priests actively led the resistance against the Communist regime, as symbolised by the Hill of Crosses and exemplified by The Chronicle of the Catholic Church in Lithuania.

3.7% of the population are Eastern Orthodox, mainly among the Russian minority. The community of Old Believers (0.6% of population) dates back to the 1660s.

Protestants are 0.8%, of which 0.6% are Lutheran and 0.2% are Reformed. The Reformation did not impact Lithuania to a great extent as seen in East Prussia, Estonia, or Latvia. Before World War II, according to Losch (1932), the Lutherans were 3.3% of the total population. They were mainly Germans and Prussian Lithuanians in the Klaipėda Region (Memel territory). This population fled or was expelled after the war, and today Protestantism is mainly represented by ethnic Lithuanians throughout the northern and western parts of the country, as well as in large urban areas. Newly arriving evangelical churches have established missions in Lithuania since 1990.

Hinduism is a minority religion and a fairly recent development in Lithuania. Hinduism is spread in Lithuania by Hindu organizations: ISKCON, Sathya Sai Baba, Brahma Kumaris and Osho Rajneesh. ISKCON (Lithuanian: Krišnos sąmonės judėjimas) is the largest and the oldest movement as the first Krishna followers date to 1979. It has three centres in Lithuania: in Vilnius, Klaipėda and Kaunas. Brahma Kumaris maintains the Centre Brahma Kumaris in Antakalnis, Vilnius.

The historical communities of Lipka Tatars maintain Islam as their religion. Lithuania was historically home to a significant Jewish community and was an important centre of Jewish scholarship and culture from the 18th century until the eve of World War II. Of the approximately 220,000 Jews who lived in Lithuania in June 1941, almost all were killed during the Holocaust. The Lithuanian Jewish community numbered about 4,000 at the end of 2009.

Romuva, the neopagan revival of the ancient religious practices, has gained popularity over the years. Romuva claims to continue living pagan traditions, which survived in folklore and customs. Romuva is a polytheistic pagan faith, which asserts the sanctity of nature and has elements of ancestor worship. According to the 2001 census, there were 1,270 people of Baltic faith in Lithuania. That number jumped to 5,118 in the 2011 census.

Education

The Constitution of Lithuania mandates ten-year education ending at age 16 and guarantees a free public higher education for students deemed 'good'. The Ministry of Education and Science of the Republic of Lithuania proposes national educational policies and goals that are then voted for in the Seimas. Laws govern long-term educational strategy along with general laws on standards for higher education, vocational training, law and science, adult education, and special education. 5.4% of GDP or 15.4% of total public expenditure was spent for education in 2016.

According to the World Bank, the literacy rate among Lithuanians aged 15 years and older is 100%. School attendance rates are above the EU average and school leave is less common than in the EU. According to Eurostat Lithuania leads among other countries of the European Union in people with secondary education (93.3%). Based on OECD data, Lithuania is among the top 5 countries in the world in postsecondary (tertiary) education attainment. , 54.9% of the population aged 25 to 34, and 30.7% of the population aged 55 to 64 had completed tertiary education. The share of tertiary-educated 25–64-year-olds in STEM (Science, technology, engineering, and mathematics) fields in Lithuania were above the OECD average (29% and 26% respectively), similarly to business, administration and law (25% and 23% respectively).

Modern Lithuanian education system has multiple structural problems. Insufficient funding, quality issues, and decreasing student population are the most prevalent. Lithuanian teacher salaries are the lowest in the entire EU. Low teacher salaries was the primary reason behind national teacher strikes in 2014, 2015, and 2016. Salaries in the higher education sector are also low. Many Lithuanian professors have a second job to supplement their income. PISA report from 2010 found that Lithuanian results in math, science and reading were below OECD average. PISA report from 2015 reconfirmed these findings. The population ages 6 to 19 has decreased by 36% between 2005 and 2015. As a result, the student-teacher ratio is decreasing and expenditure per student is increasing, but schools, particularly in rural areas, are forced into reorganizations and consolidations. As with other Baltic nations, in particular Latvia, the large volume of higher education graduates within the country, coupled with the high rate of spoken second languages is contributing to an education brain drain.

, there were 15 public and 6 private universities as well as 16 public and 11 private colleges in Lithuania (see: List of universities in Lithuania). Vilnius University is one of the oldest universities in Northern Europe and the largest university in Lithuania. Kaunas University of Technology is the largest technical university in the Baltic States and the second largest university in Lithuania. In an attempt to reduce costs and adapt to sharply decreasing number of high-school students, Lithuanian parliament decided to reduce the number of universities in Lithuania. In early 2018, Lithuanian University of Educational Sciences and Aleksandras Stulginskis University were merged into Vytautas Magnus University.

Culture

Lithuanian language

The Lithuanian language (lietuvių kalba) is the official state language of Lithuania and is recognized as one of the official languages of the European Union. There are about 2.96 million native Lithuanian speakers in Lithuania and about 0.2 million abroad.

Lithuanian is a Baltic language, closely related to Latvian, although they are not mutually intelligible. It is written in an adapted version of the Roman script. Lithuanian is believed to be the linguistically most conservative living Indo-European tongue, retaining many features of Proto Indo-European. Lithuanian language studies are important for comparative linguistics and for reconstruction of Proto-Indo-European language. Lithuanian was studied by linguists such as Franz Bopp, August Schleicher, Adalbert Bezzenberger, Louis Hjelmslev, Ferdinand de Saussure, Winfred P. Lehmann, Vladimir Toporov and others.

There are two main dialects of the Lithuanian language: Aukštaitian dialect and Samogitian dialect. Aukštaitian dialect is mainly used in the central, southern and eastern parts of Lithuania while Samogitian dialect is used in the western part of the country. The Samogitian dialect also has many completely different words and is even considered a separate language by some linguists. Nowadays, the distinguishing feature between the two main Lithuanian dialects is the unequal pronunciation of accented and unaccented two-vowels uo and ie.

The groundwork for written Lithuanian was laid in 16th and 17th centuries by Lithuanian noblemen and scholars, who promoted Lithuanian language, created dictionaries and published books – Mikalojus Daukša, Stanislovas Rapolionis, Abraomas Kulvietis, Jonas Bretkūnas, Martynas Mažvydas, Konstantinas Sirvydas, Simonas Vaišnoras-Varniškis.
The first grammar book of the Lithuanian language Grammatica Litvanica was published in Latin in 1653 by Danielius Kleinas.

Jonas Jablonskis' works and activities are especially important for the Lithuanian literature moving from the use of dialects to a standard Lithuanian language. The linguistic material which he collected was published in the 20 volumes of Academic Dictionary of Lithuanian and is still being used in research and in editing of texts and books. He also introduced the letter ū into Lithuanian writing.

Literature

There is a great deal of Lithuanian literature written in Latin, the main scholarly language of the Middle Ages. The edicts of the Lithuanian King Mindaugas are the prime example of the literature of this kind. The Letters of Gediminas are another crucial heritage of the Lithuanian Latin writings.

One of the first Lithuanian authors who wrote in Latin was Nicolaus Hussovianus (around 1480 – after 1533). His poem Carmen de statura, feritate ac venatione bisontis (A Song about the Appearance, Savagery and Hunting of the Bison), published in 1523, describes the Lithuanian landscape, way of life and customs, touches on some actual political problems, and reflects the clash of paganism and Christianity. A person under the pseudonym  (around 1490 – 1560) wrote a treatise De moribus tartarorum, lituanorum et moscorum (On the Customs of Tatars, Lithuanians and Muscovites) in the middle of the 16th century, but it was not published until 1615. An extraordinary figure in the cultural life of Lithuania in the 16th century was the lawyer and poet of Spanish origin Petrus Roysius Maurus Alcagnicensis (around 1505 – 1571). The publicist, lawyer, and mayor of Vilnius, Augustinus Rotundus (around 1520–1582) wrote a no longer existent history of Lithuania in Latin around the year 1560. loannes Radvanus, a humanist poet of the second half of the 16th century, wrote an epic poem imitating the Aeneid of Vergil. His Radivilias, intended to become the Lithuanian national epic, was published in Vilnius in 1588.

17th century Lithuanian scholars also wrote in Latin – Kazimieras Kojelavičius-Vijūkas, Žygimantas Liauksminas are known for their Latin writings in theology, rhetorics and music. Albertas Kojalavičius-Vijūkas wrote first printed Lithuanian history Historia Lithuania.

Lithuanian literary works in the Lithuanian language started being first published in the 16th century. In 1547 Martynas Mažvydas compiled and published the first printed Lithuanian book Katekizmo prasti žodžiai (The Simple Words of Catechism), which marks the beginning of literature, printed in Lithuanian. He was followed by Mikalojus Daukša with Katechizmas. In the 16th and 17th centuries, as in the whole Christian Europe, Lithuanian literature was primarily religious.

The evolution of the old (14th–18th century) Lithuanian literature ends with Kristijonas Donelaitis, one of the most prominent authors of the Age of Enlightenment. Donelaitis' poem Metai (The Seasons) is a landmark of the Lithuanian fiction literature, written in hexameter.

With a mix of Classicism, Sentimentalism and Romanticism, the Lithuanian literature of the first half of the 19th century is represented by Maironis, Antanas Baranauskas, Simonas Daukantas, Oscar Milosz, and Simonas Stanevičius. During the Tsarist annexation of Lithuania in the 19th century, the Lithuanian press ban was implemented, which led to the formation of the Knygnešiai (Book smugglers) movement. This movement is thought to be the very reason the Lithuanian language and literature survived until today.

20th-century Lithuanian literature is represented by Juozas Tumas-Vaižgantas, Antanas Vienuolis, Bernardas Brazdžionis, Antanas Škėma, Balys Sruoga, Vytautas Mačernis and Justinas Marcinkevičius.

In 21st century debuted Kristina Sabaliauskaitė, Renata Šerelytė, Valdas Papievis, Laura Sintija Černiauskaitė, Rūta Šepetys.

Architecture

Several famous Lithuania-related architects are notable for their achievements in the field of architecture. Johann Christoph Glaubitz, Marcin Knackfus, Laurynas Gucevičius and Karol Podczaszyński were instrumental in introducing Baroque and neoclassical architectural movements to the Lithuanian architecture during the seventeenth to nineteenth centuries. Vilnius is considered as a capital of the Eastern Europe Baroque. Vilnius Old Town that is full of astonishing Baroque churches and other buildings is a UNESCO World Heritage Site.

Lithuania is also known for numerous castles. About twenty castles exist in Lithuania. Some castles had to be rebuilt or survive partially. Many Lithuanian nobles' historic palaces and manor houses have remained till the nowadays and were reconstructed. Lithuanian village life has existed since the days of Vytautas the Great. Zervynos and Kapiniškiai are two of many ethnographic villages in Lithuania. Rumšiškės is an open space museum where old ethnographic architecture is preserved.

During the interwar period, Art Deco, Lithuanian National Romanticism architectural style buildings were constructed in the Lithuania's temporary capital Kaunas. Its architecture is regarded as one of the finest examples of the European Art Deco and has received the European Heritage Label.

Arts and museums

The Lithuanian Art Museum was founded in 1933 and is the largest museum of art conservation and display in Lithuania. Among other important museums are the Palanga Amber Museum, where amber pieces comprise a major part of the collection, National Gallery of Art, presenting collection of Lithuanian art of the 20th and 21st century, National Museum of Lithuania presenting Lithuanian archaeology, history and ethnic culture. In 2018 two private museums were opened – MO Museum devoted to modern and contemporary Lithuanian art and Tartle, exhibiting a collection of Lithuanian art heritage and artefacts.

Perhaps the most renowned figure in Lithuania's art community was the composer Mikalojus Konstantinas Čiurlionis (1875–1911), an internationally renowned musician. The 2420 Čiurlionis asteroid, identified in 1975, honors his achievements. The M. K. Čiurlionis National Art Museum, as well as the only military museum in Lithuania, Vytautas the Great War Museum, are located in Kaunas.
Franciszek Smuglewicz, Jan Rustem, Józef Oleszkiewicz and Kanuty Rusiecki are the most prominent Lithuanian painters of the 18th and 19th centuries.

Theatre
Lithuania has some very famous theatre directors well known in the country and abroad. One of them is Oskaras Koršunovas. He was awarded more than forty times with special prizes. Possibly most prestigious award is Swedish Commander Grand Cross: Order of the Polar Star. Today's the most famous theatres in Lithuania are in Vilnius, Kaunas, Klaipėda and Panevėžys. It is Lithuanian National Drama Theatre, Keistuolių teatras (Theatre of Freaks) in Vilnius, Kaunas State Drama Theatre, Theatre of Oskaras Koršunovas, Klaipėda Drama Theatre, Theatre of Gytis Ivanauskas, Miltinis Drama Theatre in Panevėžys, The Doll's Theatre, Old Theatre of Vilnius and others. There are some very popular theatre festivals like Sirenos (Sirens), TheATRIUM, Nerk į teatrą (Dive into the Theatre) and others. The figures dominating in Lithuanian theatre world are directors like Eimuntas Nekrošius, Jonas Vaitkus, Cezaris Graužinis, Gintaras Varnas, Dalia Ibelhauptaitė, Artūras Areima; number of talented actors like Dainius Gavenonis, Rolandas Kazlas, Saulius Balandis, Gabija Jaraminaitė and many others.

Cinema

On 28 July 1896, Thomas Edison live photography session was held in the Concerts Hall of the Botanical Garden of Vilnius University. After a year, similar American movies were available with the addition of special phonograph records that also provided sound. In 1909, Lithuanian cinema pioneers  and Ladislas Starevich released their first movies. Soon the Račiūnas' recordings of Lithuania's views became very popular among the Lithuanian Americans abroad. In 1925, Pranas Valuskis filmed movie Naktis Lietuvoje (Night in Lithuania) about Lithuanian book smugglers that left the first bright Lithuanian footprint in Hollywood. The most significant and mature Lithuanian American movie of the time Aukso žąsis (Golden goose) was created in 1965 by  that featured motifs from the Brothers Grimm fairy tales. In 1940, Romuva Cinema was opened in Kaunas and currently is the oldest still operational cinema in Lithuania. After the occupation of the state, movies mostly were used for the Soviet propaganda purposes, nevertheless Almantas Grikevičius, Gytis Lukšas, Henrikas Šablevičius, Arūnas Žebriūnas, Raimondas Vabalas were able to overcome the obstacles and create valuable films. After the restoration of the independence, Šarūnas Bartas, Audrius Stonys, Arūnas Matelis, Audrius Juzėnas, Algimantas Puipa, Dijana and her husband Kornelijus Matuzevičius received success in international movie festivals.

In 2018, 4,265,414 cinema tickets were sold in Lithuania with the average price of €5.26.

Music

Lithuanian folk music belongs to Baltic music branch which is connected with neolithic corded ware culture. Two instrument cultures meet in the areas inhabited by Lithuanians: stringed (kanklių) and wind instrument cultures. Lithuanian folk music is archaic, mostly used for ritual purposes, containing elements of paganism faith. There are three ancient styles of singing in Lithuania connected with ethnographical regions: monophony, heterophony and polyphony. Folk song genres: Sutartinės (Multipart Songs), Wedding Songs, War-Historical Time Songs, Calendar Cycle and Ritual Songs and Work Songs.

Italian artists organized the first opera in Lithuania on 4 September 1636 at the Palace of the Grand Dukes by the order of Władysław IV Vasa. Currently, operas are staged at the Lithuanian National Opera and Ballet Theatre and also by independent troupe Vilnius City Opera.

Mikalojus Konstantinas Čiurlionis is the most renowned Lithuanian painter and composer. During his short life he created about 200 pieces of music. His works have had profound influence on modern Lithuanian culture. His symphonic poems In the Forest (Miške) and The Sea (Jūra) were performed only posthumously. Čiurlionis contributed to symbolism and art nouveau and was representative of the fin de siècle epoch. He has been considered one of the pioneers of abstract art in Europe.

In Lithuania, choral music is very important. Vilnius is the only city with three choirs laureates (Brevis, Jauna Muzika and Chamber Choir of the Conservatoire) at the European Grand Prix for Choral Singing. There is a long-standing tradition of the Dainų šventė (Lithuanian Song and Dance Festival). The first one took place in Kaunas in 1924. Since 1990, the festival has been organised every four years and summons roughly 30,000 singers and folk dancers of various professional levels and age groups from across the country. In 2008, Lithuanian Song and Dance Festival together with its Latvian and Estonian versions was inscribed as UNESCO Masterpiece of the Oral and Intangible Heritage of Humanity. Gatvės muzikos diena (Street Music Day) gathers musicians of various genres annually.

Conductor Mirga Gražinytė-Tyla performing on the scenes of Rome, New York and Birmingham.

Modern classical composers emerged in seventies – Bronius Kutavičius, Feliksas Bajoras, Osvaldas Balakauskas, Onutė Narbutaitė, Vidmantas Bartulis and others. Most of those composers explored archaic Lithuanian music and its harmonic combination with modern minimalism and neoromanticism.

Jazz scene was active even during the years of Soviet occupation. The real breakthrough would occur in 1970–71 with the coming together of the Ganelin/Tarasov/Chekasin trio, the alleged instigators of the Vilnius Jazz School. Most known annual events are Vilnius Jazz Festival, Kaunas Jazz, Birštonas Jazz.
Music Information Centre Lithuania (MICL) collects, promotes and shares information on Lithuanian musical culture.

Rock and protest music

After the Soviet reoccupation of Lithuania in 1944, the Soviet's censorship continued firmly controlling all artistic expressions in Lithuania, and any violations by criticizing the regime would immediately result in punishments. The first local rock bands started to emerge around 1965 and included Kertukai, Aitvarai and Nuogi ant slenksčio in Kaunas, and Kęstutis Antanėlis, Vienuoliai, and Gėlių Vaikai in Vilnius, among others. Unable to express their opinions directly, the Lithuanian artists began organizing patriotic Roko Maršai and were using metaphors in their songs' lyrics, which were easily identified for their true meanings by the locals. Postmodernist rock band Antis and its vocalist Algirdas Kaušpėdas were one of the most active performers who mocked the Soviet regime by using metaphors. For example, in the song Zombiai (Zombies), the band indirectly sang about the Red Army soldiers who occupied the state and its military base in Ukmergė. Vytautas Kernagis' song Kolorado vabalai (Colorado beetles) was also a favourite due to its lyrics in which true meaning of the Colorado beetles was intended to be the Soviets decorated with the Ribbons of Saint George.

In the early independence years, rock band Foje was particularly popular and gathered tens of thousands of spectators to the concerts. After disbanding in 1997, Foje vocalist Andrius Mamontovas remained one of the most prominent Lithuanian performers and an active participant in various charity events. Marijonas Mikutavičius is famous for creating unofficial Lithuania sport anthem Trys milijonai (Three million) and official anthem of the EuroBasket 2011 Nebetyli sirgaliai (English version was named Celebrate Basketball).

Cuisine

Lithuanian cuisine features the products suited to the cool and moist northern climate of Lithuania: barley, potatoes, rye, beets, greens, berries, and mushrooms are locally grown, and dairy products are one of its specialties. Fish dishes are very popular in the coastal region. Since it shares its climate and agricultural practices with Northern Europe, Lithuanian cuisine has some similarities to Scandinavian cuisine. Nevertheless, it has its own distinguishing features, which were formed by a variety of influences during the country's long and difficult history.

Dairy products are an important part of traditional Lithuanian cuisine. These include white cottage cheese (varškės sūris), curd (varškė), soured milk (rūgpienis), sour cream (grietinė), butter (sviestas), and sour cream butter kastinis. Traditional meat products are usually seasoned, matured and smoked – smoked sausages (dešros), lard (lašiniai), skilandis, smoked ham (kumpis). Soups (sriubos) – boletus soup (baravykų sriuba), cabbage soup (kopūstų sriuba), beer soup (alaus sriuba), milk soup (pieniška sriuba), cold-beet soup (šaltibarščiai) and various kinds of porridges (košės) are part of tradition and daily diet. Freshwater fish, herring, wild berries and mushrooms, honey are highly popular diet to this day.

One of the oldest and most fundamental Lithuanian food products was and is rye bread. Rye bread is eaten every day for breakfast, lunch and dinner. Bread played an important role in family rituals and agrarian ceremonies.

Lithuanians and other nations that once formed part of the Grand Duchy of Lithuania share many dishes and beverages. German traditions also influenced Lithuanian cuisine, introducing pork and potato dishes, such as potato pudding (kugelis or kugel) and potato sausages (vėdarai), as well as the baroque tree cake known as Šakotis. The most exotic of all the influences is Eastern (Karaite) cuisine – the kibinai are popular in Lithuania. Lithuanian noblemen usually hired French chefs, so French cuisine influence came to Lithuania in this way.

Balts were using mead (midus) for thousands of years. Beer (alus) is the most common alcoholic beverage. Lithuania has a long farmhouse beer tradition, first mentioned in 11th century chronicles. Beer was brewed for ancient Baltic festivities and rituals. Farmhouse brewing survived to a greater extent in Lithuania than anywhere else, and through accidents of history the Lithuanians then developed a commercial brewing culture from their unique farmhouse traditions. Lithuania is top 5 by consumption of beer per capita in Europe in 2015, counting 75 active breweries, 32 of them are microbreweries. The microbrewery scene in Lithuania has been growing in later years, with a number of bars focusing on these beers popping up in Vilnius and also in other parts of the country.

Eight Lithuanian restaurants are listed in the White Guide Baltic Top 30.

Media
The Constitution of Lithuania provides for freedom of speech and press, and the government generally respects these rights in practice. An independent press, an effective judiciary, and a functioning democratic political system combine to promote these freedoms. However, the constitutional definition of freedom of expression does not protect certain acts, such as incitement to national, racial, religious, or social hatred, violence and discrimination, or slander, and disinformation. It is a crime to deny or "grossly trivialize" Soviet or Nazi German crimes against Lithuania or its citizens, or to deny genocide, crimes against humanity, or war crimes.

Best-selling daily national newspapers in Lithuania are Lietuvos rytas (about 18.8% of all daily readers),  (12.5%), Kauno diena (3.7%),  (3.2%) and Vakarų ekspresas (2.7%). Best-selling weekly newspapers are Savaitė (about 34% of all weekly readers), Žmonės (17%), Prie kavos (11.9%), Ji (8.7%) and Ekspress nedelia (5.4%).

In July 2018, the most popular national television channels in Lithuania were TV3 (about 35.9% of the auditorium), LNK (32.8%), Lithuanian National Radio and Television (30.6%), BTV (19.9%), Lietuvos rytas TV (19.1%).

The most popular radio stations in Lithuania are M-1 (about 15.8% of all listeners), Lietus (12.2%), LRT Radijas (10.5%) and Radiocentras (10.5%).

Public holidays and festivals

As a result of a thousand-years history, Lithuania has two National days. First one is the Statehood Day on 6 July, marking the establishment of the medieval Kingdom of Lithuania by Mindaugas in 1253. Creation of modern Lithuanian state is commemorated on 16 February as a Lithuanian State Reestablishment Day on which declaration of independence from Russia and Germany was declared in 1918. Joninės (previously known as Rasos) is a public holiday with paganic roots that celebrates a solstice. As of 2018, there are 13 public holidays (which come with a day off).

Kaziuko mugė is an annual fair held since the beginning of the 17th century that commemorates the anniversary of Saint Casimir's death and gathers thousands of visitors and many craftsmen. Other notable festivals are Vilnius International Film Festival, Kauno Miesto Diena, Klaipėda Sea Festival, Mados infekcija, Vilnius Book Fair, Vilnius Marathon, Devilstone Open Air, Great Žemaičių Kalvarija Festival.

Sports

Basketball is the most popular and national sport of Lithuania. The Lithuania national basketball team has had significant success in international basketball events, having won the EuroBasket on three occasions (1937, 1939 and 2003), as well a total of 8 other medals in the Eurobasket, the World Championships and the Olympic Games. The men's national team also has extremely high TV ratings as about 76% of the country's population watched their games live in 2014. Lithuania hosted the Eurobasket in 1939 and 2011. The historic Lithuanian basketball team BC Žalgiris, from Kaunas, won the European basketball league Euroleague in 1999. Lithuania has produced a number of NBA players, including Naismith Memorial Basketball Hall of Fame inductees Arvydas Sabonis and Šarūnas Marčiulionis, and current NBA players Jonas Valančiūnas, Domantas Sabonis, and Ignas Brazdeikis.

Lithuania has won a total of 26 medals at the Olympic Games, including 6 gold medals in athletics, modern pentathlon, shooting, and swimming. Numerous other Lithuanians won Olympic medals representing Soviet Union. Discus thrower Virgilijus Alekna is the most successful Olympic athlete of independent Lithuania, having won gold medals in the 2000 Sydney and 2004 Athens games, as well as a bronze in 2008 Summer Olympics and numerous World Championship medals. More recently, the gold medal won by a then 15-year-old swimmer Rūta Meilutytė at the 2012 Summer Olympics in London sparked a rise in popularity for the sport in Lithuania.

Lithuania has produced prominent athletes in athletics, modern pentathlon, road and track cycling, chess, rowing, aerobatics, strongman, wrestling, boxing, mixed martial arts, Kyokushin Karate, and other sports.

Lithuania hosted the 2021 FIFA Futsal World Cup, the first time Lithuania had hosted a FIFA tournament.

Few Lithuanian athletes have found success in winter sports, although facilities are provided by several ice rinks and skiing slopes, including Snow Arena, the first indoor ski slope in the Baltics. In 2018 Lithuania men's national ice hockey team won gold medals at the 2018 IIHF World Championship Division I.

See also

 Index of Lithuania-related articles
 List of Lithuanians
 Outline of Lithuania

Notes

References

External links

 Government
 The Lithuanian President  – Official site of the President of the Republic of Lithuania
 The Lithuanian Parliament – Official site of the Parliament of the Republic of Lithuania
 The Lithuanian Government  – Official site of the Government of the Republic of Lithuania
 Statistics Lithuania  – Official site of Department of Statistics to the Government of Lithuania
 Lithuania – Real is Beautiful – The Official Travel Guide by the Lithuanian National Tourism Development Agency

 General information
The Baltic States and geopolitics 
 Lithuania  – Lithuanian internet gates
 Lithuania. The World Factbook. Central Intelligence Agency.
 Lithuania. CIA Chiefs of State and Cabinet Members of Foreign Governments 
 Lithuania from UCB Libraries GovPubs
 
 Lithuania from the BBC News
 

 Other
 Key Development Forecasts for Lithuania from International Futures
 Heraldry of Lithuania
 

 

Countries in Europe
Northern European countries
Member states of NATO
Member states of the European Union
Member states of the Union for the Mediterranean
Member states of the United Nations
Member states of the Three Seas Initiative
Republics
States and territories established in 1918
States and territories established in 1990
OECD members